Robertsia is a genus of fig wasps in the family Pteromalidae, native to Papua New Guinea.

References

Hymenoptera genera
Pteromalidae